The full list of Paul Rodgers' discography over the years. He has released 5 studio albums, 7 live albums, 1 EP and 3 singles.

Albums

Studio albums

Live albums

EPs

Singles

References

External links
Discography of Paul Rodgers
Official Discography of Paul Rodgers

Discographies of British artists
Rock music discographies